Noarlunga is a closed railway station in Adelaide, South Australia. It was an unattended crossing station, with water available. The ticket agency was closed in 1946.

The stop is now completely disused, the entire Willunga railway line having been dismantled in 1972 and is now the route of the Coast to Vines Rail Trail.

See also
Noarlunga (disambiguation)

References

Australian Railway Historical Society Bulletin No 336, October 1965

Disused railway stations in South Australia